Revel is an American manufacturer and distributor of high-end luxury audio loudspeakers. Since 2002 it is owned by Harman International Industries, a subsidiary of Samsung Electronics since 2017. The company is based in Stamford, Connecticut, United States.

History 
Founded in 1997 by Sanford Berlin, who was owner of the Madrigal Audio Laboratories.

Partnership with Lincoln 

In 2015, it was announced at the North American International Auto Show that Revel would partner with the Lincoln Motor Company

References 

Harman International
Loudspeakers
Surround sound

Companies based in Stamford, Connecticut